Duisburg: Town and Harbour is the Theme Route No. 1 of the Industrial Heritage Trail, which passes through Duisburg, the Inner Harbour, Ruhrort, the Duisburg-Ruhrorter harbour and other attractions on the Rhine and Ruhr. These trails were first developed between 1989 and 1999.

History
The concept of grouping together legacy industrial sites to assist and enable them with marketing was developed by North Rhine Westphalia between 1995 and 1999. It came together with partners from Great Britain, the Netherlands and Belgian to apply for Interreg IIC money to develop the idea of the European Route of Industrial Heritageusing test routes in the four countries. In 2001 they produced a report showing the possible structure. The report concluded with the Duisburg Declaration. 

The first heritage trail starts in the Inner Harbour of Duisburg and finishes at the lock at Meiderich.The second centres on the Rhine Ruhrort harbours. The Third theme route on features between them. The Duisburg: Industrial Culture on the Rhine is made up these three routes.

The presentation of the route combines a caring attitude to the locations with a scientific attitude and an easily accessible manner of presentation.

Some locations are also included in other theme routes of the Industrial Heritage Trail.

An guide to the Duisburg: Town and Harbour Theme Route, Duisburg: Stadt und Hafen (Themenroute 1) by Dagmar Bungardt and Esher Gudrun has been published by the Regionalverband Ruhr, but is only available in German. A more comprehensive Atlas containing all the Theme Routes is however available with text in both German and English.

Heritage Trail 1: Inner harbour (Hafenpfad Inner)

Heritage Trail 2: Ruhrort (Hafenpfad Ruhrort)

Heritage Trail 3: Between Duisburg and Ruhrort (Schauplätze von Hafen und Schifffahrt zwischen Duisburg und Ruhrort)

References

Duisburg
Industrial history of Germany
Industrial tourism